Yadollah Maftun Amini (12 June 1926 – 1 December 2022) was an Iranian poet.

Early life
Yadollah Amini, whose literary nickname was Maftun, was born in 1926 in Shahindezh, West Azerbaijan, northwest of Iran. He did his early education up to the end of high school in Tabriz before moving to Tehran. He studied in Tehran University's Faculty of Law.

Literature works
Maftun Amini started with classical-style Persian Poetry, but gradually proceeded to modern and non-rhythmic Persian Poetry in the 1980s. Other than poems in Persian, Maftun wrote poems in his mother tongue, Azerbaijani. Ashiqli Karvan was Maftun's first Azerbaijani poetry collection. A major part of his poems in Persian are lyrics and nostalgia.

Personal life and death
Maftun Amini died on 1 December 2022, at the age of 96.

Works
Poem collections
 Ashiqli Karvan (Karavan of Ashiqs (singers)), 1960s, Tabriz
 Anarestan (Pomegranate Garden), 1967, Tabriz, Ebn-e-sina Publishers
 Ashiqli Karvan (Camel Train), 1979
 Nahang ya Mowj (Wale or Tide), Selections of Kulak and Anarestan (1979, Tehran)
 Fasl-e-Penhan (Hidden Season), Poem selections
 Man va Khazan-e-toh (Me and Your Fall), 2006, Amrud Publishers
 Shab-e-hazar-o-doh (Night of One Thousand and Two), (Includes a part in Azeri Turkish),

References

1926 births
2022 deaths
20th-century Iranian poets
21st-century Iranian poets
Azerbaijani-language poets
People from West Azerbaijan Province
University of Tehran alumni
Iranian male poets